Monica ( – 387) was an early North African Christian saint and the mother of Augustine of Hippo. She is remembered and honored in the Catholic and Orthodox Churches, albeit on different feast days, for her outstanding Christian virtues, particularly the suffering caused by her husband's adultery, and her prayerful life dedicated to the reformation of her son, who wrote extensively of her pious acts and life with her in his Confessions. Popular Christian legends recall Monica weeping every night for her son Augustine.

Life
Monica is assumed to have been born in Thagaste (present-day Souk Ahras, Algeria). She is believed to have been a Berber on the basis of her name. She was married early in life to Patricius, a decurion pagan, in Thagaste. Patricius reportedly had a violent temper and appears to have been of dissolute habits; apparently his mother exhibited similar behaviours. Monica's almsgiving, deeds and prayer habits annoyed Patricius, but it is said that he always held her in respect.

Monica had three children who survived infancy: two sons, Augustine and Navigius, and a daughter, 'Perpetua' of Hippo. Unable to secure baptism for them, she grieved heavily when Augustine fell ill. In her distress she asked Patricius to allow Augustine to be baptized; he agreed, then withdrew this consent when the boy recovered.

But Monica's relief at Augustine's recovery turned to anxiety as he misspent his renewed life being wayward and, as he himself says, lazy. He was finally sent to school at Madauros. He was 17 and studying rhetoric in Carthage when Patricius died.

Augustine had become a Manichaean at Carthage. When, upon his return home, he shared his views regarding Manichaeism, Monica drove him away from her table. However, she is said to have experienced a vision that convinced her to reconcile with him.

At this time she visited a certain (unnamed)  bishop who consoled her with the words, "the child of those tears shall never perish." Monica followed her wayward son to Rome, where he had gone secretly; when she arrived he had already gone to Milan, but she followed him again. Here she found Ambrose and through him she ultimately saw Augustine convert to Christianity after 17 years of resistance.

In his book Confessions, Augustine wrote of a peculiar practice of his mother in which she "brought to certain oratories, erected in the memory of the saints, offerings of porridge, bread, water and wine." When she moved to Milan, the bishop Ambrose forbade her to use the offering of wine, since "it might be an occasion of gluttony for those who were already given to drink". So, Augustine wrote of her: 

Monica and her son spent six peaceful months at Rus Cassiciacum (present-day Cassago Brianza) after which Augustine was baptized by Ambrose in the church of St John the Baptist at Milan. Monica and Augustine left for Africa and they set out on their journey, stopping at Civitavecchia and at Ostia. Here Monica died, and Augustine's grief inspired his Confessions.

Veneration

Monica was buried at Ostia and at first seems to have been almost forgotten, though her body was removed during the 6th century to a hidden crypt in the church of Santa Aurea in Ostia. Monica was buried near the tomb of Aurea of Ostia. Her tomb was later transferred to the Basilica of Sant'Agostino, Rome.

Anicius Auchenius Bassus wrote Monica's funerary epitaph, which survived in ancient manuscripts. The actual stone on which it was written was rediscovered in the summer of 1945 in the church of Santa Aurea. The fragment was discovered after two boys were digging a hole to plant a football post in the courtyard beside Santa Aurea.

A translation from Latin by Douglas Boin reads:

During the 13th century, however, the cult of Saint Monica began to spread and a feast in her honour was kept on 4 May. In 1430, Pope Martin V ordered that the relics be brought to Rome. Many miracles are said to have occurred on the way, and the cultus of Saint Monica was definitely established. Later the archbishop of Rouen, Guillaume d'Estouteville, built a church at Rome in honour of Augustine, the Basilica di Sant'Agostino, and deposited the relics of Saint Monica in a chapel to the left of the high altar. The Office of St. Monica, however, does not seem to have found a place in the Roman Breviary before the 16th century.

In 1934, in the Dutch city of Utrecht, the order of the 'Zusters Augustinessen van Sint-Monica' was founded, doing social work, offering a shelter for women with unwanted pregnancies or women who were the victims of domestic violence or abuse. The sisters also started a number of primary schools. In their heyday the order had six convents, in Amsterdam, Utrecht, Sittard, Maastricht, Hilversum and Arnouville on the outskirts of Paris. Since the Hilversum convent, City of God, was closed in 2014, only Utrecht remains as a rest home for the elderly among the sisters, and Casella, a woodland retreat near Hilversum, where young people are still welcome for a meditative sojourn.   

The city of Santa Monica, California, is named after Monica. A legend states that in the 18th century Father Juan Crespí named a local dripping spring Las Lágrimas de Santa Mónica ("Saint Monica’s Tears"; today known as the Serra Springs) that was reminiscent of the tears that Monica shed over her son's early impiety. As recorded in his diary, however, Crespí actually named the place San Gregorio. What is known for certain is that by the 1820s, the name Santa Monica was in use and its first official mention occurred in 1827 in the form of a grazing permit. There is a statue of this saint in Santa Monica's Palisades Park by sculptor Eugene Morahan; it was completed in 1934.

Monica is honored in the Church of England and in the Episcopal Church on 4 May.

In popular culture
Patricia McGerr fictionalized her life in the 1964 novel My Brothers, Remember Monica: A Novel of the Mother of Augustine.

In the 2010 film Restless Heart: The Confessions of Saint Augustine, Saint Monica is portrayed by Italian actress Monica Guerritore.

In the oratorio La conversione di Sant'Agostino (1750) composed by Johann Adolph Hasse (libretto by Duchess Maria Antonia of Bavaria), Monica's role in the conversion of her son Augustine is dramatized.

In his poem "Confessional", Frank Bidart compares the relationship between Monica and her son Augustine to the relationship between the poem's speaker and his mother.

In “The Angel of Warning,” the fifth episode of season 3 of the TV series Evil, David explains that Monica was Black, although traditionally portrayed as white in religious art. In the tenth episode of season 3, he calls on St. Monica while jogging past a demonic apparition of sexual temptation in the guise of his colleague Kristen. He continues to pray for deliverance from temptation and is visited by St. Monica.

Gallery

References

Citations

Sources

Further reading

 Everett Ferguson, Encyclopedia of Early Christianity, Taylor & Francis, 1998, p. 776
 John J. O'Meara, The Young Augustine: The Growth of St. Augustine's Mind up to His Conversion, London, Longmans, Green and Co., 1954
 Volker Schier and Corine Schleif, Opening the Geese Book: The Feast of Saint Monica, 2018

External links

 at EWTN
Saint Monica at Sacred Texts

330s births
387 deaths
4th-century Roman women
Numidian saints
Berber Christians
4th-century Christian saints
People from Souk Ahras
Burials at Sant'Agostino, Rome
Late Ancient Christian female saints
4th-century Berber people
Ancient African women
Women in Algeria
Anglican saints